Travis Clay Lakins Sr. (born June 29, 1994) is an American professional baseball pitcher who is currently a free agent. He made his MLB debut in 2019 with the Boston Red Sox.

Career
Lakins attended Franklin High School. Lakins played college baseball for the Ohio State Buckeyes, and in 2014, he pitched a perfect game for the Chillicothe Paints, a collegiate summer baseball team.

Boston Red Sox
The Red Sox selected Lakins in the sixth round of the 2015 MLB Draft, signing him for an above-slot bonus of $320,000. Lakins struck out three batters in two shutout innings during his only appearance with the Class A Short Season Lowell Spinners in 2015. He then pitched for the GCL Red Sox, but only in the playoffs. He also used a heavy mix of curveballs and changeups both early and behind in counts, showing consistency with the secondaries pitches and refined command and control overall.

In 2016, Lakins was promoted two levels up to the Class A-Advanced Salem Red Sox.  In the month of April, he led the Salem pitching staff with a 3–1 record and a 2.13 ERA in four starts, striking out 26 and walking 10 in  innings of work. In early August, Lakins was placed on the disabled list with right elbow inflammation and did not pitch for the rest of the season. He went 6–3 in 19 starts and a relief appearance, featuring a 5.93 ERA with 79 strikeouts and 36 walks in 91 innings.

Lakins spent 2017 with both Salem and the Double-A Portland Sea Dogs, posting a combined 5–4 record with a 4.21 ERA in  innings between both teams. He finished the year rated as the Red Sox' No. 13 prospect, according to MLB.com. Lakins started the 2018 season with Double-A Portland. At the end of July, he was promoted to the Triple-A Pawtucket Red Sox. Overall for the 2018 season, Lakins made 36 appearances, compiling a record of 3–2 with an ERA of 2.32 and three saves.

The Red Sox added Lakins to their 40-man roster after the 2018 season. Lakins opened the 2019 season with Pawtucket, and on April 23, he was added to Boston's major league active roster for the first time. He made his MLB debut that day, pitching  innings against the Detroit Tigers while allowing one run and striking out two. Lakins was optioned to Pawtucket on April 26. He was recalled on May 23 and optioned back on May 29, then recalled on June 12 and optioned back on June 17. Boston next recalled Lakins on August 12, and optioned him back to Pawtucket on August 20. Lakins was recalled to Boston on September 1, when rosters expanded. Overall with the 2019 Red Sox, Lakins appeared in 16 games (three starts), compiling an 0–1 record with 3.86 ERA and 18 strikeouts in  innings.

Lakins was designated for assignment by the Red Sox on January 17, 2020.

Baltimore Orioles
Lakins was traded on January 21, 2020, to the Chicago Cubs for future considerations. He was claimed off waivers by the Baltimore Orioles on January 31. He was informed of the transaction while on a late-honeymoon cruise with his wife. In 22 appearances for the Orioles in 2020, Lakins pitched to a 2.81 ERA and 25 strikeouts over  innings.

On June 29, 2021, Lakins made his first start of the season, but left in the second inning with an apparent injury. On July 3, he was placed on the 60-day injured list with right elbow pain, although manager Brandon Hyde described the injury as a “significant elbow injury”. On July 6, Lakins underwent season-ending surgery to fix a recurrent olecranon stress fracture in his right elbow. In 24 appearances with the 2021 Orioles prior to his injury, Lakins recorded a 1–4 record and 5.79 ERA. On October 14, Lakins was outrighted off of the 40-man roster.

On April 15, 2022, Lakins' contract was selected by the Orioles. He was sent outright on August 31, 2022. He elected free agency on October 6, 2022.

Personal life
Lakins has been married since 2017; he and his wife have a daughter ( Brezzlynne Lou Lakins ) and a two son's (Travis Lakins Jr.) and ( Tucker Lee Lakins ) .

References

External links

1994 births
Living people
People from Franklin, Ohio
Baseball players from Ohio
Major League Baseball pitchers
Boston Red Sox players
Baltimore Orioles players
Ohio State Buckeyes baseball players
Lowell Spinners players
Salem Red Sox players
Portland Sea Dogs players
Pawtucket Red Sox players
Norfolk Tides players